Klein-Winternheim is an Ortsgemeinde – a municipality belonging to a Verbandsgemeinde, a kind of collective municipality – in the Mainz-Bingen district in Rhineland-Palatinate, Germany.

Geography

Location
Klein-Winternheim lies seven kilometres south of Mainz in Rhenish Hesse. The winegrowing centre belongs to the Verbandsgemeinde of Nieder-Olm, whose seat is in the like-named town.

History
In the oldest Mainz Cathedral obituary from about 1100, the name Winterheim crops up for the first time.

Politics

Municipal council
The council is made up of 20 council members, plus the part-time mayor, with seats apportioned thus:

(as at municipal election held on 13 June 2004)

Town partnerships
 Muizon, Marne, France
 Elxleben, Sömmerda district, Thuringia – close contacts since 1990

Coat of arms
The municipality's arms might be described thus: Gules a saltire couped Or, in base a wheel spoked of six argent; Wheel of Mainz.

Economy and infrastructure

The municipality's economy was long dominated by winegrowing and fruit growing. Since the state capital is nearby, however, many commercial businesses have also been drawn to the municipal area. For example, a car's technical condition can be certified by the Gesellschaft für Technische Überwachung (“Company for Technical Inspection”, which is officially recognized in Germany as a certification body).

A tapping service is offered and for winemakers there is a big speciality shop for winery demands with unique expertise (more than 50 years) in sulphur dioxide handling. As the only German dealer in this field, the shop's stock runs the gamut of products from containers, accessories and duct components to volumetric metering systems.

Transport
The municipality lies right near the Autobahn A 63 with its Klein-Winternheim (3) interchange.
The Deutsche Bahn railway station Klein Winternheim-Ober Olm is in the community (Alzey–Mainz line).

References

Municipalities in Rhineland-Palatinate
Mainz-Bingen